Rupshu is a high elevation plateau and valley and an eponymous community development block in southeast Ladakh.

Description

Frederic Drew describes the Rupshu valley as follows:

Drew states that the valleys of Rupshu continue beyond the Tso Kar lake until the Tso Moriri lake, and also extend to the east to cover the valley of Hanle.

At its narrowest definition, the Rupshu valley ranges from 20 km northwest of Tso Moriri to 50 km northwest. It is inhabited by the Changpa nomads and contains the Tso Kar salt lake.  

More widely, the term "Rupshu" is used for a wider area, ranging from the Manali-Leh Highway region to the west to east of Tso Moriri, incorporating some of the Ladakhi portion of the Changthang Plateau area in which Tso Moriri is found.

References 

 Sources

External links 
A travel article about Rupshu region by Rangan Datta published in The Statesman, 16 June 2004.

Geography of Ladakh